Ray Genet (July 27, 1931 – October 2, 1979), often referred to by the nickname Pirate, was a Swiss-born American mountaineer.  He was the first guide on North America's highest mountain, Alaska's Denali (Mount McKinley).
Genet is the grandfather of actress Q'Orianka Kilcher.

Career
Genet's association with Denali began in 1967, when, although he had no previous mountaineering experience, he participated in the first successful winter expedition to Denali's summit, led by Gregg Blomberg. The expedition is described in Minus 148 Degrees: The First Winter Ascent of Mount McKinley (1970) by Art Davidson.

Death
Genet died on October 2, 1979, while descending Mount Everest with his fellow climber Hannelore Schmatz, succumbing to hypothermia in the night.

The two Sherpa guides, Sungdare Sherpa and Ang Jangbo, stayed with them in their bivouac but Genet did not survive until morning. The group was running low on bottled oxygen, and Schmatz died trying to get down to South Col with Sungdare later that day.

References

Citations

Bibliography

See also
 List of people who died climbing Mount Everest

1931 births
1979 deaths
American summiters of Mount Everest
Deaths from hypothermia
Denali
Mountaineering deaths on Mount Everest
People from Matanuska-Susitna Borough, Alaska
Swiss emigrants to the United States
Deceased Everest summiters